Google Santa Tracker is an annual Christmas-themed entertainment website first launched in 2004 by Google that simulates the tracking of the legendary character Santa Claus on Christmas Eve, using predetermined location information. It also allows users to play, watch, and learn through activities that are added daily in December. The service was inspired by NORAD Tracks Santa, which has operated since 1955.

History
In early 2004, employees at Google stated that "they felt like it could be better for users to 'visualize' where Santa is currently at" in response to the NORAD Tracks Santa service. Later that year, Keyhole, Inc. was acquired by Google in 2004, they launched a paid service titled the "Keyhole Earth Viewer" (Google Earth's original name), where they would launch a service within the program titled the "Keyhole Santa Radar". The service received 25,000 viewers in its debut, and 250,000 the following year. 

In 2007, NORAD and Google formally announced a partnership which would last for the next five years.

In 2015, Google announced that Google Santa Tracker is now open source through GitHub. This would mean that its users could install Google Santa Tracker as an APK file on Android devices. They also announced a handful of custom watch faces for Android Wear.

In 2018, the Santa Tracker added several features for students and educators. On December 4, 2018, the website fully launched a suite of games and lesson plans about coding basics and Christmas traditions around the world. The site also features information about non-profit organizations Khan Academy and Code.org. The 2018 Google Santa Tracker page also allowed users to use the Google Assistant to simulate a call to Santa or listen to a Christmas story. The website had 42.2 million visitors in December of that year. The website claimed that Santa had delivered 5.6 billion presents in 2019.

In 2020 and 2021, during the COVID-19 pandemic, Santa, Mrs. Claus and the elves were depicted to be wearing face masks. The face masks were removed in 2022.

Website

Every Christmas Eve, the Google Santa Tracker begins to simulate tracking of Santa at about midnight in the furthest east time zone (10:00am UTC). The map shows Santa alternating between traveling and handing out presents in cities. Santa appears to travel approximately one time zone west per hour. Counters simulate to viewers how far Santa has traveled so far, how long until he reaches the viewer's city on the map, the distance from the viewer's city, and the total number of presents delivered. Santa is depicted as having helpers with him, including the standard reindeer and elves, along with penguins and a snowman.

For each city that Santa is said to visit, the first few paragraphs of the corresponding Wikipedia article are shown, giving an overview of the city. The website also shows photos with the city in the background and a depiction of Santa or his helpers in the foreground. The temperature of the city is accurately given using data from The Weather Channel. Not every large city is visited; some large cities close to other large cities are skipped, while smaller cities that are far from any other populated place are occasionally featured. Even when Santa is traveling, the counter showing the total presents delivered increases, but at a slower rate than when Santa is in a city. This rate is faster or slower depending on the population of the city Santa is in.

The 2016 site also featured a "This Just In" section. This section features photos resembling those taken on social media websites, which feature Santa and his helpers partaking in various activities, including imitating the cover of Abbey Road, delivering presents, and taking selfies. Users can also watch animated sketches and play games.

References

External links
 

Santa Tracker
Santa Claus
2004 establishments in the United States
Internet properties established in 2004